Ryan Hietala (born November 8, 1973) is an American professional golfer who played on the PGA Tour and the Nationwide Tour.

Hietala was born in Bellingham, Washington. He played college golf at the University of Texas-El Paso, graduating in 1998 with a degree in criminal justice. He turned professional in 1997.

Hietala has played on several mini-tours and third-tier tours: Tight Lies Tour (1997–2001), Canadian Tour (1998), and Golden Bear Tour (2002). He played on the Nationwide Tour in 1999, 2003–2005, 2007–2009. He played on the PGA Tour in 2006 after finishing T18 in the 2005 qualifying school. He made only seven cuts in 23 starts with his best finish at the FedEx St. Jude Classic - T38.

Hietala has two wins on the Nationwide Tour.

Professional wins (2)

Nationwide Tour wins (2)

Nationwide Tour playoff record (1–0)

See also
2005 PGA Tour Qualifying School graduates

External links

American male golfers
UTEP Miners men's golfers
PGA Tour golfers
Golfers from Washington (state)
Golfers from Idaho
Sportspeople from Bellingham, Washington
Sportspeople from Boise, Idaho
1973 births
Living people